Tan Sri Dato' Sri Chan Kong Choy (born 17 May 1955) is an adjunct professor at the University of Malaya and was a Malaysian politician and the former deputy president of the Malaysian Chinese Association (MCA), a component party of the then-ruling Barisan Nasional (BN) coalition. He was formerly Minister of Transport from 1 July 2003 to 18 March 2008 and has never lost a general election in his political career.

Life and career
Chan Kong Choy was born in Bentong, Pahang on 17 May 1955 to an ethnic Malaysian Chinese family of Cantonese descent with ancestry from Yunfu, Guangdong, China. He studied in Kolej Tunku Abdul Rahman in 1975 for his Sijil Tinggi Pelajaran Malaysia (STPM). He graduated with first class honours in Chinese Study from University of Malaya in 1979. He went on to obtain a post-graduate Diploma in Education, University of Malaya in 1980. Throughout his career, he has held many positions.

Chan is married to Ann Chan and the couple has four children.

He has served the MCA national leadership for 16 years. Chan has been a Minister for five years and thirteen years as Deputy Minister in the federal government beside four years as Pahang State executive councillor. He has served nine years as MCA Youth chairman, and the Federal and State Government portfolios continuously since 1986. In 1986 general election, Chan was elected as Pahang state assemblyman for Tanah Rata and he was selected by Pahang State Government as its executive councillor and held that post until 1990. After contested and won the parliamentary seat of Lipis, Pahang in the 1990 general election, Chan was elevated by the party leadership and made a Deputy Minister in the Culture, Arts and Tourism Ministry. In 1990, Chan became the party's National Youth chairman. Chan was re-elected to a second term as the National Youth chairman in the 1993 party elections.

Chan was made MCA vice-president in 1999 and subsequently assumed the Deputy Finance Minister's post after the general elections that same year. With his experience in the party leadership and Government, Chan faithfully remained as Deputy Minister and party vice-president. The MCA Central Committee appointed Chan as the party's new deputy president with the resignation of Datuk Lim Ah Lek from that post.

Chan was the Member of Parliament for Selayang, Selangor from 1995 to 2008. Chan successfully won the parliamentary constituency of Selayang in General Elections of 1990, 1995, 1999 and 2004 for the Barisan Nasional or National Front coalition.

Chan did not defend his parliamentary seat in the 12th general elections held on 18 March 2008 thus stepped down from his cabinet post as Transport Minister citing health reasons and to make way for young blood. He subsequently did not contest back the post of deputy president of MCA in the party election on 18 October 2008 too which was won by Chua Soi Lek.

After retiring from active politics, Chan pursued his passion in academia and is currently serving the University of Malaya as an Adjunct Professor.

In 2016, Chan donated his personal collection of literary works on 'The Dream of The Red Chamber', one of the four greatest classical novels in Chinese literature to University of Malaya. The collection has 6000 pieces of literary works and is touted as the largest private collection outside of mainland China.

Controversy
In 2011, Chan was charged with cheating former prime minister Abdullah Ahmad Badawi over the PKFZ scandal. Due to his court charges, the Sultan of Selangor, Sultan Sharafuddin Idris Shah suspended Chan's Datukship pending the outcome of the court trial, which subsequently happened to be a positive outcome for Chan. In 2014, the High Court acquitted Chan the three charges of cheating in the PKFZ scandal after the prosecution withdrew charges against him thus clearing his name of any wrongdoing.

Chronology of positions
 Lecturer, Universiti Putra Malaysia (UPM)1980 - 1990
 Political SecretaryMinistry of Housing & Local Government (Datuk Lee Kim Sai)1986
 EXCO MemberPahang State Government1986 - 1990
 Member Of Parliament1990 - 2008
 Deputy MinisterCulture, Arts & Tourism1990 - 1995
 Deputy MinisterEnergy, Communication & Multimedia1995 - 1999
 Deputy MinisterMinistry Of Finance1999 - May 2003
 Minister of Transport1 July 2003 - 18 March 2008

Election results
{| class="wikitable" style="margin:0.5em ; font-size:95%"
|+ Pahang State Legislative Assembly
!|Year
!|Constituency
!colspan=2|Candidate  
!|Votes
!|Pct
!colspan=2|Opponent(s)
!|Votes
!|Pct
!|Ballots cast
!|Majority
!|Turnout
|-
| rowspan=3|1986
| rowspan=3|N01 Tanah Rata
| rowspan=3  |
| rowspan=3| (MCA)
| rowspan=3 align="right"|4,006	
| rowspan=3|52.22%|  |
|  (DAP)
| align="right" |2,117	
| 27.60%
| rowspan=3|7,671	 
| rowspan=3|1,889	 
| rowspan=3|63.22%
|-
|  |
|  (IND)
| align="right" | 890
| 11.60%
|-
|  |
|  (IND)
| align="right" | 318
| align="right" |4.15%
|}

Honours
Honours of Malaysia
  :
  Commander of the Order of Loyalty to the Crown of Malaysia (PSM) – Tan Sri (2008)
  :
  Knight Companion of the Order of Sultan Ahmad Shah of Pahang (DSAP) – Dato' (1990)
  Grand Knight of the Order of Sultan Ahmad Shah of Pahang (SSAP) – Dato' Sri (2003)
  :
  Knight Commander of the Order of the Crown of Kelantan (DPMK) – Dato' (2003)
  :
  Knight Commander of the Order of the Crown of Selangor (DPMS) – Dato' (2003)
  :
  Knight Commander of the Order of the Star of Sarawak (PNBS) – Dato Sri''' (2006)

References

External links

 2004 Malaysian General Election result

 
 
 

Living people
1955 births
People from Pahang
Malaysian politicians of Chinese descent
Malaysian people of Cantonese descent
Malaysian Chinese Association politicians
Members of the Dewan Rakyat
Government ministers of Malaysia
Transport ministers of Malaysia
Members of the Pahang State Legislative Assembly
Pahang state executive councillors
University of Malaya alumni
Commanders of the Order of Loyalty to the Crown of Malaysia
Knights Commander of the Most Exalted Order of the Star of Sarawak